The Hun School of Princeton is a private, coeducational, secondary boarding school located in Princeton in Mercer County, New Jersey, United States. The school serves students from sixth through twelfth grades. The Hun School of Princeton is a highly selective, all gender independent school for boarding and day students in grades six through twelve, and post-graduates. Located in Princeton, New Jersey, and founded in 1914, it is one of the oldest secondary schools in the United States.

The school teaches a skills-based curriculum through Harkness discussions, interdisciplinary projects, and experiential learning. With creative coursework and cutting edge programs like NextTerm, Hun faculty challenge students to question convention and bring reason, empathy, and ethics to their decision-making.

Jonathan G. Brougham is The Hun School’s tenth and current head of school. The school is a register 401C Non-Profit, under the financial direction of a volunteer Board of Trustees. The school’s faculty are responsible for governing matters related to student life and the classroom.

The Hun School has an acceptance rate of approximately 20%. In 2022, approximately 30% of students received financial aid. Historically, 100% of each graduating class has matriculated to a four year college or university.

History

The school was founded in 1914 by Dr. John Gale Hun, a professor at Princeton University. Originally called the Princeton Math School, it later changed its name to the Princeton Tutoring School. In 1925, the school acquired both its current name and the property on Edgerstoune Road that makes up its current location.

Student body
As of the 2019–20 school year, the school had an enrollment of 669 students and 95 classroom teachers (on an FTE basis), for a student–teacher ratio of 7:1. The school's student body was 59.8% (400) White, 23.9% (160) Asian, 6.1% (41) Black, 5.4% (36) two or more races, 4.5% (30) Hispanic and 0.3% (2) American Indian / Alaska Native. 95 students attend the Hun Middle School, which houses grades 6–8. The rest are in the Upper School. 70% of Hun's Upper School students are day students, and the rest are boarders. Students come from 15 states and 27 countries.

Athletics

The Hun School Raiders participate in the Mid-Atlantic Prep League, a sports league with participating institutions from university preparatory schools in the New Jersey, New York and Pennsylvania area. Schools competing in the league include Blair Academy in Blairstown, New Jersey, The Hill School in Pottstown, Pennsylvania, Lawrenceville School in Lawrenceville, New Jersey, Mercersburg Academy in Mercersburg, Pennsylvania and Peddie School in Hightstown, New Jersey. The Hun School also competes against other local schools.

Fall sports: coed cross-country running, dance, girls' field hockey, boys' football, boys' and girls' soccer, girls' tennis, water polo
Winter sports: boys' and girls' basketball, boys' and girls' fencing, ice hockey, boys' and girls' swimming
Spring sports: boys' baseball, boys' and girls' crew, dance, golf, boys' and girls' lacrosse, girls' softball, Track, boys' tennis

Sports offered by the Hun Middle School include:

Fall sports: boys' and girls' cross-country running, boys' and girls' soccer, girls' field hockey
Winter sports: boys' and girls' basketball
Spring sports: boys' and girls' tennis, boys' lacrosse, boys' baseball, girls' softball

The 1931 team won the Class A Prep state title with a 24-18 victory against St. Benedict's Preparatory School in the tournament final.

Facilities 

The Hun School facilities consist of multiple buildings across the small Princeton neighborhood. The school recently completed a massive renovation, including the construction of the Wilf Family Global Commons, a $9 million,  dormitory and educational facility. The School is currently undergoing a $5.5 million renovation of the Alexander K. Buck '49 Building, which holds middle school classrooms, video production laboratories, and gathering spaces.

Russell Hall
Poe Dormitory (1959)
Carter Hall (1964)
The Alexander K. Buck Student Activity Center (1974) - The setting of the Middle School, serving grades 6-8
The John Andrew Saks Auditorium
The Chesebro Academic Center (1964) - Used as the Upper School
The Ralph S. Mason House (1984)
The Michael D. Dingman Center for Science and Technology (1987)
The Perry K. Sellon Information Center (1987)
The Roberta J. King Outdoor Education Center
The Mary Miller Sharp Ceramic and Sculpture Studio (1994)
The Finn M.W. Caspersen Rowing Center at Mercer Lake (2003)
The Heart of Hun (2004)
Natale Field (2004)
The Ventresca Family Video Production and TV Studio (2005)
Athletic Center (2007)
The Shipley Pavilion (2007) - The Gymnasium
The Landis Family Fine Arts Building (2008)
The Wilf Family Global Commons (2014)

School publications 
The Mall, Upper School newspaper
The Edgerstounian, Upper School yearbook
The Hun Review, a literary magazine showcasing the writing and artwork of Hun School students
Hun Today, a magazine for alumni, families, and friends of The Hun School

Clubs and organizations 
Upper School clubs and organizations include: Amnesty International, Asian Language and Culture Club, Black Student Union, Ceramics Club, Chamber Music Players, Chess Club, Choir, Concert Choir, Diversity Club, Edgertones (Girls' A Cappella), Environmental/Outdoor Club, Environmental Sustainability Club, Extension Chords (Coed A Cappella), Forensics (Speech, Debate and Congress), French Club,  Gaming Society, Gay-Straight Alliance, Gospel Choir, Hun Film Society, Hun TV, International Thespian Society, Janus Players (Theatre), Jazz Band, Latin Club, Key Club, Knitting Club, Masala-Indian Culture Club, Math Competition Club, Model UN, Model Congress, Jewish Studies and Culture Club,  Ski Club, Spanish Club, VoiceMale (Boys' A Cappella), and Young Alumni Association.
Middle School clubs include: Arts Club, Bits and Pieces Club, Craft Club, Creative Drama Club, Frisbee Club, Hearts Club, Hun TV, Kickball Club, and Scrabble Club.
Students also may participate in Peer Leadership, Honor Council, Student Council, Edgerstoune Society, and Red Shield Society.

Notable alumni

 Nicole Arendt (born 1969), professional tennis player.
 Mitchell Block (born c. 1950, class of 1968), documentary film maker whose film Poster Girl was nominated for an Academy Award for Best Documentary (Short Subject).
 John Bohlinger, (born c. 1967), musician.
 Richard Cytowic (born 1952, class of 1970), neurologist and author of The Man Who Tasted Shapes.
 Lew Elverson (1912–1997), college football player and coach, track and field coach, and college athletics administrator.
 Dick Foran (1910–79), actor known as the "Singing Cowboy," starred in Fort Apache, The Petrified Forest, and Black Legion.
 Mike Ford (born 1992), first baseman for the New York Yankees.
 Steve Garrison (born 1986), a major league pitcher for the New York Yankees.
 Richard Guadagno, a passenger aboard United Airlines Flight 93 thought to have helped in the overtaking of the plane on September 11, 2001, terrorist attacks.
 Ethan Hawke (born 1970), star of Reality Bites, Gattaca, Training Day (Academy Award nomination for Best Supporting Actor), and Before Sunset (Academy Award nomination for Best Adapted Screenplay).
 Susan Hendricks (born 1973, class of 1991), CNN Headline News anchor.
 Eric Jackson, the 47th Mayor of Trenton, New Jersey.
 Jesse L. Lasky Jr. (1910-1988), screenwriter, novelist, playwright and poet.
 Robert Littell (born 1936), New Jersey State Senator.
 Leopoldo López (born 1971, class of 1989), opposition Venezuelan politician, founder and leader of Voluntad Popular
 Herb Maack (1917-2007), former Brooklyn Dodgers (AAFC) player and college football head coach.
 Les Otten (born 1949), Vice-Chairman and Partner of the Boston Red Sox.
 Stephen Polin (born 1947, class of 1965), surrealist artist.
 Jason Read (born 1977), bow seat in the 2004 Summer Olympics Gold medal-winning, U.S. Men's Rowing Team.
 Myron Rolle (born 1986), Rhodes Scholar and safety for the Tennessee Titans.
 Elliott Roosevelt (1910–1990), World War II aviation expert, author, and son of Franklin D. Roosevelt.
 Khalid bin Faisal Al Saud (born 1940), Saudi prince who was Governor of 'Asir Province, now Governor of Mecca Province, Director General of the King Faisal Foundation.
 Saud bin Faisal Al Saud (born 1941), Saudi prince, Foreign Minister of Saudi Arabia.
 Camille Schrier (born 1995), Miss America 2020.
 Alfred Dennis Sieminski (1911–1990), represented New Jersey's 13th congressional district from 1951–1959.
 Paul Steiger (born 1942), managing editor of The Wall Street Journal, vice president of Dow Jones.
 Tyler Stockton, college football coach and former player who serves as the defensive coordinator and inside linebackers coach at Ball State University.
 Austin Sylvester (born 1988), fullback for the Denver Broncos.
 Dan Topping (1912–1974), part owner and president of the New York Yankees baseball team from 1945 to 1964.
 Thomas Watson Jr. (1914–1993), former CEO of IBM and Ambassador to the Soviet Union under President Jimmy Carter.
 Orin Wilf (born 1973/74), real estate developer
 Nick Williams (born 1990), former wide receiver for the Tennessee Titans.

References

External links

Data for the Hun School of Princeton, National Center for Education Statistics
The Association of Boarding Schools profile

1914 establishments in New Jersey
Boarding schools in New Jersey
Educational institutions established in 1914
Middle States Commission on Secondary Schools
New Jersey Association of Independent Schools
Private high schools in Mercer County, New Jersey
Private middle schools in New Jersey
 
Schools in Princeton, New Jersey